(A heart that knows its Jesus is living),
 134, is a church cantata for Easter by Johann Sebastian Bach. Bach composed the cantata for the third day of Easter in Leipzig and first performed it on 11 April 1724. He based it on his congratulatory cantata , first performed in Köthen on 1 January 1719.

History and words 
The cantata is Bach's second composition for Easter in Leipzig. On Easter Sunday of 1724, he had performed , from his time in Mühlhausen. On the second day of Easter, which he had derived from the secular serenata , composed in Köthen in 1718. In a similar way, he arranged a cantata for the New Year's Day of 1719 in Köthen, for the third day of Easter.

The prescribed readings for the feast day were from the Acts of the Apostles, the sermon of Paul in Antioch, and from the Gospel of Luke, the appearance of Jesus to the Apostles in Jerusalem. The unknown poet adapted the dialogues of the secular work of two allegorical figures, Time and Divine Providence, originally written by Christian Friedrich Hunold, one of the notable novelists of his time. In this cantata the poet kept the order of the movements, dropping movements 5 and 6 of the early work. He kept the final chorus as a conclusion, unlike , where it had been moved to the opening and replaced by a chorale. Bach simply wrote the new text below the former text in his score.

Bach composed three new recitatives for a second version and first performed it on 27 March 1731. Bach revised the whole cantata, writing a new score with detailed improvements, possibly first performed on 12 April 1735.

Scoring and structure 

The cantata in six movements is scored for alto and tenor soloists, a four-part choir, two oboes, two violins, viola, and basso continuo.

 Recitative (alto, tenor): 
 Aria (tenor): 
 Recitative (alto, tenor): 
 Aria (alto, tenor): 
 Recitative (alto, tenor): 
 Chorus:

Recordings 
 J. S. Bach: 10 Festkantaten, Helmut Winschermann, Kantorei Barmen-Gemarke, Deutsche Bachsolisten, Julia Hamari, Kurt Equiluz, Philips 1971
 Die Bach Kantate Vol. 30, Helmuth Rilling, Gächinger Kantorei, Bach-Collegium Stuttgart, Helen Watts, Adalbert Kraus, Hänssler 1977
 J. S. Bach: Das Kantatenwerk – Sacred Cantatas Vol. 7, Gustav Leonhardt, Knabenchor Hannover, Collegium Vocale Gent, Leonhardt-Consort, René Jacobs, Marius van Altena, Teldec 1983
 Bach Made in Germany Vol. 4 – Cantatas VII, Hans-Joachim Rotzsch, Thomanerchor, Neues Bachisches Collegium Musicum, Ortrun Wenkel, Peter Schreier, Eterna 1984
 J. S. Bach: Complete Cantatas Vol. 10, Ton Koopman, Amsterdam Baroque Orchestra & Choir, Michael Chance, Paul Agnew, Antoine Marchand 1998
 J. S. Bach: Vol. 22, English Baroque Soloists, Monteverdi Choir, Daniel Taylor, James Gilchrist, Soli Deo Gloria 2000
 J. S. Bach: Cantatas Vol. 18 – Cantatas from Leipzig 1724, Masaaki Suzuki, Bach Collegium Japan, Robin Blaze, Makoto Sakurada, BIS

References

Sources 
 
 Ein Herz, das seinen Jesum lebend weiß [early version] BWV 134; BC A 59a / Sacred cantata Bach Digital
 Ein Herz, das seinen Jesum lebend weiß [later version] BWV 134; BC A 59b / Sacred cantata Bach Digital
 Cantata BWV 134 Ein Herz, das seinen Jesum lebend weiß on the Bach Cantatas Website
 BWV 134 Ein Herz, das seinen Jesum lebend weiß University of Vermont

Church cantatas by Johann Sebastian Bach
1724 compositions
Music for Easter